Charles Esque Fleming (born 1962) is an American lawyer and judge from Ohio who is a United States district judge of the United States District Court for the Northern District of Ohio.

Education 

Fleming received his Bachelor of Arts from Kent State University in 1986 and his Juris Doctor from Case Western Reserve University Law School in 1990.

Legal career 

From 1990 to 1991, Fleming was an associate at Forbes, Forbes & Associates in Cleveland. From 1991 to 2022, he served as the assistant federal public defender in the office of the federal public defender for the Northern District of Ohio in Cleveland. From 2010 to 2016 he was the investigative and paralegal staff supervisor for the public defender's office as well as the Cleveland trial team supervisor from 2016 to 2021.

Federal judicial service 

On September 30, 2021, President Joe Biden nominated Fleming to serve as a United States district judge of the United States District Court for the Northern District of Ohio. President Biden nominated Fleming to the seat vacated by Judge James S. Gwin, who assumed senior status on January 31, 2021. On November 17, 2021, a hearing on his nomination was held before the Senate Judiciary Committee. On December 16, 2021, his nomination was reported out of committee. On January 3, 2022, his nomination was returned to the President under Rule XXXI, Paragraph 6 of the United States Senate; he was renominated the same day. 

On January 13, 2022, his nomination was reported out of committee by a 13–9 vote. On February 1, 2022, the Senate invoked cloture on his nomination by a 55–41 vote. Later that day, his nomination was confirmed by a 56–42 vote. He received his judicial commission on February 8, 2022. Fleming became the second active African-American judge on the court.

See also 
 List of African-American federal judges
 List of African-American jurists

References

External links 

1962 births
Living people
20th-century American lawyers
21st-century American judges
21st-century American lawyers
African-American judges
African-American lawyers
Case Western Reserve University School of Law alumni
Kent State University alumni
Judges of the United States District Court for the Northern District of Ohio
Lawyers from Cleveland
Ohio lawyers
Public defenders
United States district court judges appointed by Joe Biden